According to the Federal Bureau of Investigation's most recent hate crime statistics report (2018), of the 7,036 single-bias incidents reported in 2018, 1,196 (16.7%) were targeted based on their sexual orientation. Among the 1,196 targeted based on sexual orientation, 21 incidents were specifically anti-bisexual. A hate crime intentionally singles out a victim based on real or perceived identities. A hate crime is one form of victimization. Victimization is any damage or harm inflicted by one individual onto another. Victimization may be motivated by many factors; one such factor is the identity of the victim. Identity-based victimization is distinct because the inflicted act of damage or harm impacts an individual who experiences systemic marginalization. In the case of sexual minority individuals, this systemic marginalization is heterosexism. Heterosexism is a process whereby systems of power privilege the relationships, behaviors, actions, and identity of one group (i.e., heterosexuals) while stigmatizing, minimizing, and denying others.

Heterosexism is witnessed within the broader society and between individuals. Societal heterosexism is evident within institutions of power (i.e., the legal system, higher education institutions, and the military) and cultural norms. The lack of protection against workplace discrimination for sexual minority individuals is one example of societal-based heterosexism. Heterosexism at the individual level may manifest both psychologically and behaviorally. Psychological heterosexism occurs internally and involves dislike, rejection, and hostility towards sexual minority individuals. Psychological heterosexism may be internal (i.e., personally held private beliefs) or external (i.e., the outward expression of heterosexist feelings and ideas). Interpersonal heterosexism is one form of external heterosexism. Interpersonal heterosexism includes hostility, discrimination, harassment, and violence committed by individuals against other individuals based on their sexual orientation. These forms of interpersonal heterosexism are also considered forms of victimization. The expression of same-sex attraction, behavior, or identity is known to result in victimization (i.e., harassment and violence) worldwide. Victimization based on identity is associated with adverse mental health outcomes. Victimization based on sexual orientation results in higher rates of anxiety, depression, and posttraumatic stress disorder.

In the United States, an estimated 1.8% of the general population identifies as bisexual, with even higher rates among adolescent cohorts (4.9%). The term bisexual describes various attractions, sexual and relational behaviors directed towards individuals of more than one gender. Individuals who identify as bisexual may also use other additional terms to describe their sexual orientation such as, pansexual or queer. Bisexual individuals experience more significant adverse mental health outcomes than straight, lesbian, and gay individuals. These outcomes include anxiety, depression, a higher number of recent adverse life experiences, more adversity in childhood, less familial support, less general social support, and more significant financial stress.

Out of all sub-groups within the LGBTQ+ community, bisexual women make up the largest demographic of sexual minority individuals in the United States (5.5%). The increased rates of adverse outcomes seen among bisexual individuals broadly is seen more acutely among bisexual women. In particular, 58.7%  of bisexual-identified women report mood, and  57.8% report anxiety disorders. Health discrepancies between bisexual and heterosexual individuals are due in part to minority stress. Minority stress is the chronic daily stress burden that sexual minority individuals experience due to heterosexism. All sexual minority individuals are at increased risk for victimization; however, bisexual individuals are at an even higher risk due to bisexual-specific stressors such as anti-bisexual attitudes within the broader Lesbian, Gay, Bisexual, Transgender, Queer (LGBTQ+) community. Within-group anti-bisexual attitudes contribute to more significant identity confusion and decreased connection to the broader LGBTQ+ community. Bisexuality is associated with stigmatizing stereotypes, including increased promiscuity, untrustworthiness (Rust, 1995), and the belief that bisexuality is an illegitimate or unstable identity. These stereotypes maintain negative attitudes towards bisexual individuals within the LGBTQ+ community and broader society, ultimately increasing bisexual individuals' likelihood of being victimized. Decreased connection to the LGBTQ+ community mainly contributes to the adverse mental health outcomes in this population due to the protective effect that community connection is known to have against minority stress for sexual minority individuals.

Several types of victimization are higher among bisexual individuals than gay and lesbian individuals. These include threats, physical assault, and physical assault involving a weapon. Bisexual individuals also experience higher sexual violence rates, including rape and childhood sexual abuse. Bisexual women, in particular, experience childhood sexual abuse at rates 5.3 times higher than heterosexual women. Further, the age of onset for childhood sexual abuse is younger among bisexual women compared to bisexual men. Bisexual women also experience higher rates of rape (46.1%) and sexual violence (74.9%) compared to both lesbian and heterosexual-identified women. In addition to experiencing a higher frequency of sexual violence, bisexual women are also more likely to report more extreme sexual violence forms than lesbian-identified women. Similarly, bisexual women experience higher victimization rates within interpersonal relationships, termed interpersonal trauma (IPT), compared to straight and lesbian women. Sexual victimization, in particular, is linked to subsequent adverse mental health (i.e., the development of PTSD symptomatology, increased suicidality) and negative sexual health outcomes. Higher rates of victimization in conjunction with the cumulative load of minority stress (i.e., daily experiences of discrimination) contributes to higher rates of posttraumatic stress disorder (PTSD) among bisexual individuals.

See also
 Sapphobia

References

Biphobia
Hate crime
Misogyny